Jim Cusack (2 November 1930 – 29 November 2019) was an Australian rules footballer who played with Fitzroy in the Victorian Football League (VFL).

Notes

External links 

2019 deaths
1930 births
Australian rules footballers from Victoria (Australia)
Fitzroy Football Club players
Warragul Football Club players